Chamundeshware Studio is a major motion picture film studio located in Bengaluru, Karnataka, India. It was established in the year 1969 by Coimbatore based movie moghul S. M. Sriramulu Naidu along with his nephew Kuppuswamy Naidu.

References 

1969 establishments in Mysore State
Film production companies of Karnataka
Indian film studios